Serdang may refer to:
Kampong Serdang, a village in Brunei
Sultanate of Serdang, an ancient Indonesian monarchy
Seri Kembangan, a town in Selangor, Malaysia
Serdang, a town in Kedah, Malaysia
, a Singaporean coaster
Serdang, Kemayoran, a kelurahan in Kemayoran, Central Jakarta
Serdang (federal constituency), represented in the Dewan Rakyat
Seri Serdang (state constituency), represented in the Selangor State Legislative Assembly
Serdang (Selangor state constituency), formerly represented in the Selangor State Legislative Assembly (1959–95)
Serdang (Kedah state constituency), formerly represented in the Kedah State Legislative Assembly (1974–86)

See also
Deli Serdang, a regency in North Sumatra, Indonesia
PSDS Deli Serdang, an Indonesian soccer team in North Sumatra